The Bundesvision Song Contest 2009 was the fifth edition of the annual Bundesvision Song Contest musical event. The contest was hosted by Stefan Raab, Johanna Klum, and Elton in the green room. This was the first contest in which a public service broadcaster, Bayern 3, supported the contest.

The participants and their states were announced between 19 January and 12 February 2009 on TV total.

The winner of the Bundesvision Song Contest 2009 was Peter Fox with the song "Schwarz zu blau", representing Berlin, the state's second win. In second place was Polarkreis 18 representing Saxony, and third place to Rage representing North Rhine-Westphalia.

10 of the 16 states awarded themselves the maximum of 12 points, with Brandenburg, Lower Saxony, North Rhine-Westphalia, Rhineland-Palatinate, Saxony-Anhalt, and Schleswig-Holstein awarding themselves 10 points each.

Results

Scoreboard

References

External links
 Official BSC website at tvtotal.de

2009
Bundesvision Song Contest
2009 song contests